The 1949–50 NBA season was the first season for the Indianapolis Olympians in the National Basketball Association (NBA).

NBA Draft

Roster

|-
! colspan="2" style="background-color: #318CE7;  color: #FFFFFF; text-align: center;" | Indianapolis Olympians 1949–50 roster
|- style="background-color: #FFFFFF; color: #C41E3A;   text-align: center;"
! Players !! Coaches
|- 
| valign="top" |

! Pos. !! # !! Nat. !! Name !! Ht. !! Wt. !! From
|-

Regular season

Season standings

Record vs. opponents

Game log

Playoffs

West Division Semifinals
(1) Indianapolis Olympians vs. (4) Sheboygan Red Skins: Olympians win series 2-1
Game 1 @ Indianapolis (March 21): Indianapolis 86, Sheboygan 85
Game 2 @ Sheboygan (March 23): Sheboygan 95, Indianapolis 85
Game 3 @ Indianapolis (March 25): Indianapolis 91, Sheboygan 84

This was the first playoff meeting between the Olympians and Red Skins.

West Division Finals
(1) Indianapolis Olympians vs. (2) Anderson Packers: Packers win series 2-1
Game 1 @ Indianapolis (March 28): Indianapolis 77, Anderson 74
Game 2 @ Anderson (March 30): Anderson 84, Indianapolis 67
Game 3 @ Indianapolis (April 1): Anderson 67, Indianapolis 65

This was the first playoff meeting between the Olympians and Packers.

References

Indianapolis Olympians seasons
Indianapolis